This is a list of 223 species in the genus Rhopalomyia.

Rhopalomyia species

References